Pillow Pals were a line of plush toys made by Ty, Inc. during the 1990s. The toys were given their name because they were soft like a pillow, and were made with children in mind. Though many of them resembled certain Beanie Babies, those that did not share names with their Beanie Baby counterparts. Such Pillow Pals saw a decline in popularity in the late 1990s with the introduction of Beanie Buddies, which were also larger versions of various Beanie Babies. In January 1999, all Pillow Pals were redesigned, and their colors were changed. This line did not sell well, and was discontinued by Ty around the end of the year. Today, PillowPals LLC takes children's drawings and replicates them into 3D pillows.

At the time of the final retirement, Ty donated its remaining stock of pillow pals to the Ronald McDonald House to be distributed to sick children.

List of Pillow Pals
The following Pillow Pals were made during the 1990s:

'''After the 1999 redesign, the following Pillow Pals were made:

References

1990s toys
Beanie Babies